John Du Cane is an author and CEO of the company Dragon Door Publications. He has written various books, videos and DVDs about T'ai chi and Qigong.

John Du Cane was born in Africa in 1949. He studied at Cambridge University. He made thirty-four films between 1972 and 1975 during a brief period of activity in which he was associated with the London Film-Makers' Co-op. At the same time, he was an advocate of new work by British and international film artists, writing weekly previews and articles for Time Out and other magazines of the period. He now lives in the United States.

John Du Cane claims he began his Qigong and T'ai chi practice in 1975. He claims as his teachers Master Chiu, the official representative of the Yang Family in Europe, Grandmaster Choi, Grandmaster Shou-Yu Liang, Grandmaster Chen Xiaowang, Grandmaster Chen Xiaoxing, and Jose Figueroa.

Since 1990, John Du Cane has owned Dragon Door Publications, a mail order house and publisher for books and videos on kettlebells, qigong, healing, fitness, nutrition, and internal martial arts. John Du Cane and Pavel Tsatsouline are also credited with starting the modern kettlebell fitness movement in the US in 2001 with the manufacture of kettlebells in the US and the creation of the world's first kettlebell instructor certification program.

Books
Five Animal Frolics Qigong For High Energy, Vitality and Well Being (Book and Digital Book)
John Du Cane’s Qigong Recharge: A Daily Practice to Release, Relax and Rejuvenate (Kit DVD, Kit Manual, Manual Book, Manual Digital Book)

References

External links
Film biography
Dragon Door biography

1949 births
Living people
American exercise and fitness writers
American exercise instructors
American health and wellness writers